Kaiyamo is a surname. Notable people with the surname include:

Elia Kaiyamo (born 1951), Namibian politician
Nico Kaiyamo (born 1961), Namibian politician and businessman